The Great American Songbook: Live at Michael's Pub is a 1992 live album by the American jazz singer Mel Tormé.

Track listing
"You Gotta Try" (Sammy Nestico) - 4:06
"Ridin' High"/"I'm Shootin' High" (Cole Porter)/(Ted Koehler, Jimmy McHugh) - 2:57
"You Make Me Feel So Young" (Mack Gordon, Josef Myrow) - 3:56
"Stardust" (Hoagy Carmichael, Mitchell Parish) - 4:58
"I'm Gonna Go Fishin'" (Duke Ellington, Peggy Lee) - 3:01
"Don't Get Around Much Anymore"/"I Let a Song Go Out of My Heart" (Ellington, Irving Mills, Henry Nemo)/(Ellington, John Redmond, Bob Russell) - 2:53
"Sophisticated Lady"/"I Didn't Know About You" (Ellington, Mills, Parish)/(Ellington, Russell) - 5:58
"Rockin' in Rhythm" (Harry Carney, Ellington, Mills) - 4:22
"It Don't Mean a Thing (If It Ain't Got That Swing)" (Ellington, Mills) - 6:30
"A Lovely Way to Spend an Evening" (Harold Adamson, McHugh) - 3:34
"I'll Remember April"/"I Concentrate on You" (Gene de Paul, Johnston, Don Raye)/ (Porter) - 4:55
"Autumn in New York" (Vernon Duke) - 4:18
"Just One of Those Things"/"On Green Dolphin Street" (Porter)/(Bronislaw Kaper, Ned Washington) - 4:19
"All God's Chillun Got Rhythm" (Walter Jurmann, Gus Kahn, Kaper) - 2:45
"The Party's Over" (Betty Comden, Adolph Green, Jule Styne) - 0:57

Personnel 
Recorded on October 8,9, 1992 in New York City, U.S.:

Tracks 1-15

 Mel Tormé - vocals, drums, arranger
 John Walsh - trumpet
 Ross Konikoff - trumpet
 Frank London - trumpet
 Bob Milikan - trumpet
 Tom Artin - trombone
 Rich Willey - trumpet
 Adam Brenner - clarinet, alto saxophone
 Jeff Rupert - clarinet, tenor saxophone
 David Schumacher - bass clarinet, baritone saxophone
 Jack Stuckey - clarinet, flute, alto saxophone
 Jerry Weldon - clarinet, tenor saxophone
 John Leitham - double bass
 John Colianni - piano
 Donny Osborne - drums

References

Mel Tormé live albums
1992 live albums
Telarc International Corporation albums
Albums produced by Carl Jefferson